1987 Football Championship of Ukrainian SSR was the 57th season of association football competition of the Ukrainian SSR, which was part of the Soviet Second League.

The 1987 Football Championship of Ukrainian SSR was won for the second time by SC Tavriya Simferopol. Qualified for the interzonal playoffs, the team from Crimean Oblast managed to gain promotion by winning its group.

Teams

Map

Promoted teams
Vorskla Poltava – Champion of the Fitness clubs competitions (KFK) (debut)

Relegated teams 
 None

Renamed teams 
Prior to the start of the season Atlantyka Sevastopol was renamed to Chaika Sevastopol.

League standings

Top goalscorers
The following were the top ten goalscorers.

See also
 Soviet Second League

External links
 1988 Soviet Second League, Zone 6 (Ukrainian SSR football championship). Luhansk football portal
 1987 Soviet championships (all leagues) at helmsoccer.narod.ru

1987
3
Soviet
Soviet
football
Football Championship of the Ukrainian SSR